Héctor Angulo (Santa Clara, Cuba, 1932 – 2018) was a Cuban composer who combined in his works the result of deep studies about Afro-Cuban folklore and the most modern techniques of musical composition.

Academic background
Héctor Angulo began his musical studies in Santa Clara and concluded in Havana, where he was instructed by professors Zenaida Romeu, Serafín Pró and Julián Orbón.
Angulo studied Architecture during four years at the University of Havana. In 1959 he attended a summer course in Tanglewood, United States, and at a later time, during that same year, he received a grant to study at the Manhattan School of Music in New York, where he stayed for the next three years. Angulo returned to Cuba in 1964, where he continued his music composition studies with Leo Brouwer.
While studying in the United States, Hector Angulo informed the famous American folk-singer Pete Seeger about a famous Cuban song called Guajira Guantanamera; referring to a version composed by his previous professor Julián Orbón, which utilized the poem of José Martí as its lyrics. That way, Angulo played an important role in the worldwide diffusion of that popular song.
About this subject the Cuban double-bassist and musicographer Antonio Gómez Sotolongo says:
"In 1961, the improvised verses ("décimas") on the "Guajira Guantanamera" were not still in fashion; but the young Cuban musician Héctor Angulo (Santa Clara, September 3, 1932), who was studying in the United States and was a music professor, used to sing the poems of José Martí as he had heard from his professor Julián Orbón. According to the American folklorist Pete Seeger, he knew about that song from the students that were also Angulo's disciples, and was from Héctor himself that he learned to sing it."

Professional activities
Héctor Angulo began to compose during the mid-forties decade of the 20th Century, and his first pieces were premiered during the fifties decade.
Upon his return to Cuba after studying in the United States, Angulo became immersed in the activity of the musical avant-garde of the sixties, and his Works "Trío" for flute, violin and piano from 
1965, and his "Sonata for eleven instruments" from 1967 represented a contribution to the Cuban modern music at that time, due to the utilization of "series" and "aleatoric" techniques. In his work it is possible to notice a constant search for a "Cuban style" and an important influence of the works of Roldán and Caturla; about which he himself commented: " I am a follower of the aesthetics of Alejandro García Caturla considering the fact that his work is based on the presence of Cuban elements in the aspects of timbre, rhythm, melody and form […]"
We can find a sign of his prominent interest for the Cuban folklore, and especially the Afr-Cuban folklore in his "Tríptico de Cantos Afrocubanos", based on the transcription of 250 melodies by the folklorist Rogelio Martínez Furé; as well as in other compositions, such as his "CInco poemas africanos, and his "Cantos Yorubá de Cuba", for solo guitar. In this same fashion we can mention the chamber opera Ibeyi Añá, based on the story called "Se cierran y se abren los caminos de Cuba", gathered by Lydia Cabrera in her "Cuban black stories". Héctor Angulo also worked as adviser at the Cuban "National Puppet Theater".

Works
Orchestra

 Variaciones, 1967, cuerdas
 Mirandolina, 1975, pequeña orquesta
 A los estudiantes del 71, 1976, guitarra y orquesta
 Tres cantos, 1981, textos: Miguel Barnet, Héctor Angulo y Gerardo Fulleda, voz grave y orquesta
 La llama, 1984, texto: Manuel Navarro Luna, voz media, orquesta de cuerdas, piano y percusión
 El himno unánime, 1992, textos: José Martí y Nicolás Guillén, cantata, para soprano, coro masculino y orquesta
 Somos la misma tierra, 1993, barítono y orquesta de cuerdas
 Ecos, 1996, orquesta de cuerdas.
 Música de cámara
 Cuarteto, 1964, para arcos
 Sobre un canto a Changó, para dos pianos, Sexteto, para metales, y Trío, flauta, violín y piano, 1965
 Preludio y rumba, 1966, para clarinete y piano
 Sonata, 1967, para dos flautas, oboe, trompeta, piano, tímpani, dos violines, viola, cello y contrabajo
 Poema, 1970, para flauta, fagot, violín, cello y piano
 Climas, 1972, para violín, cello y piano
 Del Gran zoo, 1974, texto: Nicolás Guillén, para flauta y guitarra, con recitante opcional
 Cuarteto núm. 2, 1976, para guitarra, violín, viola y cello
 Punto y tonada, 1978, para flauta y piano
 Toque (homenaje a Amadeo Roldán), 1980, para piano y diez percusionistas
 Bucólica, 1984, para saxofón soprano y banda magnetofónica
 Música para un títere, para violín, cello y piano
 Fantasía sobre un cuento ruso, para flautín, violín, cello y piano
 Evocación de Villa-Lobos, para cello y arpa, 1986
 Preludio para una flor, 1988, para guitarra y piano
 Ramo, para guitarra y piano 
 Tema final para Ernesto (TV), 1989
 Versión de contradanzas de Saumell, para violín y piano
 Sonera, para violín y piano, 1993
 Canto a la amistad, 1993-1994, para piano y quinteto de viento
 Canciones infantiles, 1994, para cello y piano
 Transcripciones de cuatro sones de París de Carlo Borbolla, 1995, violín y piano.

Choir

 Despedida, texto: Federico García Lorca, para coro mixto a capella
 Cortaron tres árboles, texto: Federico García Lorca, para coro mixto a capella, 1963
 Tres canciones sin texto, 1964, para coro infantil y piano
 Sin un beso no puede ser, texto: Nicolás Guillén, para coro mixto a capella, 
 Esta es tu tierra, texto: Pablo Armando Fernández, para coro mixto a capella, 1980
 Mistrales, 1981, texto: Gabriela Mistral, para coro femenino y arpa
 En los álamos del monte, 1986, texto: José Martí, para coro mixto a capella
 La lágrima de amor, 1987, texto: José Jacinto Milanés, para coro mixto a capella
 Poemas de Milanés, 1989, texto: José Jacinto Milanés, para coro femenino y piano
 Vino usted de tan lejos, 1992, texto: Nicolás Guillén, para coro mixto a capella
 Palma sola, 1992, texto: Nicolás Guillén, para coro mixto a capella.

Piano

 Piezas sencillas, 1954
 Sonatina, 1957
 Contradanza, 1959
 Estudio para una épica, 1977
 Evocaciones, 1978
 Estudios, I y II, 1983
 Zapateo cubano, 1984
 Estudios, III y IV, 1988.

Guitar

 Punteado, 1956
 Son y décima, 1964
 Cantos Yorubá de Cuba 
 Elogio a Calvert Casey, 1970
 Cantos para ir juntos, 1972
 Sonera (homenaje al bongó), 1976, parados guitarras
 Puntos cubanos, 1984
 Para Roberto y Clara, 1990, para dos guitarras
 Titiritera, 1996.
 
Accompanied voice

 Un son para niños antillanos, texto: Nicolás Guillén, para voz aguda y piano, y Palma sola, texto: Nicolás Guillén 1962
 A Cucalambé, 1963, texto: Juan Cristóbal Nápoles Fajardo
 Ibeyi Añá, 1968, texto: Camejo-Rogelio Martínez Furé, para tenor y conjunto de cámara con folklore (coro); Poemas africanos, texto: Anónimo africano, para voz aguda y piano, y Cantos afrocubanos, sobre cantos folklóricos en lengua yorubá, para voz media y piano, 1969
 La batalla del mundo, texto: José Martí, para voz grave, flauta, violín, cello y piano, Y te busqué, texto: José Martí, para voz aguda y piano, y Sé de un pintor, texto: José Martí, para voz aguda y piano, 1973
 Homenaje a Salvador Allende, 1976, texto: Pablo Neruda, para recitante y piano que toca percusión
 Poema con niños, texto: Nicolás Guillén, recitante, para flauta, oboe, clarinete, fagot, corno y piano, y Las tierras heridas, texto: Agostinho Neto, para recitante y piano,1977
 La estrella y la paloma, 1978, texto: José Martí, para recitante, flauta, guitarra, cello y percusión
 Sinfín, 1980, texto: Mirta Aguirre, para voz aguda y piano
 Tres cantos, textos: Miguel Barnet, Héctor Angulo y Gerardo Fulleda, para voz grave y piano, Así se hace la historia, texto: Pablo Armando Fernández, para barítono, flauta, trompeta, cello, piano y arpa, y Jesús, ópera en un acto, voces solistas y coro con piano (provisionalmente), 1981
 Mistrales, para voz aguda y piano, y La llama, texto: Manuel Navarro Luna, voz media y piano, 1984
 Que todos estén, 1985, texto: David Chericián, para voz media y piano
 Los álamos del monte, 1986, texto: José Martí, para voz media y piano
 La lágrima de amor, 1987, texto: José Jacinto Milanés, voz media y piano
 Veintidós pregones para el filme Papobo, 1987-1988, texto: Hugo Alea, para voces a capella
 Pregón, 1989, texto: Excilia Saldaña, para voz y piano
 Como la tierra del llano a la montaña, 1995, texto: José Martí, para barítono, quinteto de viento y de cuerdas
 Floripondito o Los títeres son personas, 1996, ópera de cámara, texto: Nicolás Guillén, para voz y piano
 Tirry 81, texto: Carilda Oliver Labra, para voz aguda y piano, y Sonetos, texto: Rafaela Chacón Nardi, para voz aguda y piano, 1997
 Aquellos, 1998, texto: Bertolt Brecht, para voz aguda y piano
 La Aurora, 1999, texto: Federico García Lorca, para flauta, violín y piano, con recitante.

Theatre

 Larga noche de Medea, 1959
 Variaciones para muertos en percusión, 1966
 Las Máscaras, La soga en el cuello, El Sótano, y Pedro y el lobo, Teatro Infantil, 1967
 Otra vez Jehová con el cuento de Sodoma, La Rueda, e Ibeyi Añá, Guiñol Nacional, 1968
 Mutatis mutandi, 1969, El Sótano
 Vladimiro Maiakovski  y Una niña busca una canción, 1970
 Programa Yeats, 1971
 Guiso de conejo, Parque Lenin, y El ratón poeta, Guiñol Nacional, 1972
 Viajemos al mundo de los cuentos, 1973
 Los animalitos del bosque y Tingo talango, 1974
 Mirandolina, Rita Montaner, y Coplas americanas, Grupo Teatro Popular Latinoamericano, 1975
 Los profanadores, Rita Montaner, y La lechuza ambiciosa, Guiñol Nacional, 1976
 Caperucita roja, Guiñol Nacional, y Orfeo en carnaval, 1980
 Bebé y el señor don Pomposo y El tigre Pedrín, 1981
 Cucarachita martina, 1982
 Pinocho y Mascarada, 1984
 El caballito jorobadito, 1986
 En tiempos de ña seré, 1987
 Para subir al cielo se necesita, 1988
 El sol es nuestro y Variedades de Guiñol, 1989
 Un sitio bajo el sol, 1990
 El que sigue la consigue, 1991
 Floripondito o Los títeres son personas, 1996
 La lechuza canta de noche, 1996, Guiñol Nacional.

See also
Music of Cuba

References

External links
 Cantos Yoruba de Cuba – Flores Chaviano: Youtube: https://www.youtube.com/watch?v=CQo7FHeyzOw
 Pete Seeger canta la Guantanamera que le escuchó a Héctor Angulo: Youtube: https://www.youtube.com/watch?v=HOF58Pn_FHM

1932 births
2018 deaths
20th-century classical composers
20th-century male musicians
Cuban classical composers
Latin music composers
Male classical composers
People from Havana